The politics of Ecuador are multi-party. The central government polity is a quadrennially elected presidential, unicameral representative democracy. The President of Ecuador is head of state and head of the army on a multi-party system, and leads a cabinet with further executive power. Legislative power is not limited to the National Assembly, as it may to a lesser degree be exercised by the executive which consists of the President convening an appointed executive cabinet. Subsequent acts of the National Assembly are supreme over Executive Orders where sufficient votes have been cast by the legislators. The judiciary is independent of the executive and the legislature. Ecuador is also considered a constitutional republic.

The Constitution of Ecuador provides for a four-year term of office for the President, Vice-President, and members of the National Assembly with concurrent elections. Presidents and legislators may be re-elected immediately. Citizens must be at least 16 years of age to vote: suffrage is universal and compulsory for literate persons aged 18 to 65 and optional for 16 and 17 years of age and other eligible voters.

Political conditions
Ecuador's political parties have historically been small, loose organizations that depended more on populist, often charismatic, leaders to retain support than on programs or ideology. Frequent internal splits have produced extreme factionalism. However, a pattern has emerged in which administrations from the center-left alternate with those from the center-right. Although Ecuador's political elite is highly factionalized along regional, ideological, and personal lines, a strong desire for consensus on major issues often leads to compromise. Opposition forces in Congress are loosely organized, but historically they often unite to block the administration's initiatives and to remove cabinet ministers.

Constitutional changes enacted by a specially elected National Constitutional Assembly in 1998 took effect on 10 August 1998. The new constitution strengthens the executive branch by eliminating mid-term congressional elections and by circumscribing Congress' power to challenge cabinet ministers. Party discipline is traditionally weak, and routinely many deputies switch allegiance during each Congress. However, after the new Constitution took effect, the Congress passed a Code of Ethics which imposes penalties on members who defy their party leadership on key votes.

Beginning with the 1996 election, the more indigenous, less Spanish-rooted, ethnic groups abandoned their traditional policy of shunning the official political system and participated actively. The indigenous population has established itself as a significant force in Ecuadorian politics, as shown by the selection of indigenous representative Nina Pacari, who led the indigenous political party, Pachakutik, as Second Vice-President of the 1998 Congress.

Judicial branch

The former Supreme Court of Ecuador 
New justices of the Supreme Court of Ecuador were elected by the sitting members of the court. A bare majority of Congress, acting in a special session called by former President Lucio Gutiérrez in December 2004, ousted 27 of the 31 justices and replaced them with new members chosen by Congress; notwithstanding, the lack of any provisions permitting impeachment of Supreme Court justices by Congress and the specific provisions giving the Court the power to select new members. Earlier, in November 2004, Congress replaced the majority of judges on the country's Electoral Court and Constitutional Court by a similar process.

List of presidents

Reorganization of Court (2008) 
After the adoption of a new Constitution in 2008, the judicial branch of the country was completely renewed to provide a cooperative leadership by having a judicial and an administrative head. As such, the bodies of Ecuador's judicial branch now consisted of the National Court of Justice, provincial courts (created by the National Court), tribunals and judges, National Council of the Judicature, Public Defendants' Office, and State Attorneys' Office. The 2008 Constitution also led to the creation of the Constitutional Court of Ecuador.

National Court of Justice 
The National Court of Justice seats 21 judges elected for a period of 9 years. They are elected by the Judiciary Council based on a merits contest held by that office. They are the final stage of any judicial process serving as a Court of Cassation and create binding precedent based on Triple Reiterative Rulings from the Chambers of the Court. The President of the Court is elected among the members of the Court for a Period of three years, representing the Judicial Branch before the State.

List of presidents

Judiciary Council 
The administrative branch of the judicial power consists of the Judiciary Council. The Council is formed by 9 Vocals who are elected by the Branch of Transparency and Social Control, which is formed by the Control Authorities of the State. The Vocals are elected also by a merits contest and it shall be formed by six experts in law and 3 experts in management, economics and other related areas. However, after the National Referendum that took place on 5 May 2011 led to the passing of a proposition impulsed by the government, the Judiciary Council changed its formation by making a constitutional amendment. Currently, a Tri-Party Commission is serving as a Transitional Council with delegates from the Legislative, Executive and Transparency Branch, in order to reform the broken judicial system of the country.

Constitutional Court of Ecuador 
The Constitutional Court of Ecuador does not exercise legal revision, but rather constitutional control of situations where constitutional rights are violated. Also they are the sole body in the State to interpret what the Constitution says.

List of presidents 

As of 2019, the court has the following members:

 Hernán Salgado Pesántes
 Carmen Corral
 Agustín Grijalva
 Teresa Nuques
 Enrique Herrera
 Karla Andrade
 Ramiro Ávila
 Daniela Salazar
 Alí Lozada

Executive branch

Structure 
The executive branch includes 28 ministries. Provincial governors and councilors, like mayors and aldermen and parish boards, are directly elected. Congress meets throughout the year except for recess in July and December. There are 20 seven-member congressional committees.

Presidency 
The President and Vice-President are elected on the same ticket by popular vote for a four-year term.

Controversy surrounding Lucio Gutiérrez 
On 20 April 2005, by an act of Congress, Lucio Gutiérrez was dramatically removed from office. The last election was held on 20 October 2002 and a runoff election on 24 November 2002 (with the next one to be held in 2006 per the four-year term limits).

Former Vice-President Alfredo Palacio assumed the presidency on 20 April 2005 after Congress removed Lucio Gutiérrez amid escalating street protests precipitated by growing criticism of Gutiérrez's Supreme Court appointments.

Presidency of Rafael Correa 
A presidential election was held on 15 October and 26 November 2006. Rafael Correa defeated Alvaro Noboa in a run-off election, or second and final round. Correa won with 56.8% of the vote. There was an attempted coup against President Rafael Correa in 2010. The Economist described Correa as "a left-wing populist", while The Washington Post has characterized Correa's ideological approach as being "economically populist, socially conservative, [and] quasi-authoritarian".

Rafael Correa’s three consecutive terms (from 2007 to 2017) were followed by Lenín Moreno’s four years as president (2017–21).

Current officeholders 

The 11 April 2021 election run-off vote ended in a win for conservative former banker, Guillermo Lasso, taking  52.4% of the vote compared to 47.6% of left-wing economist Andrés Arauz, supported by exiled former president, Rafael Correa. Previously, President-elect Lasso finished second in the 2013 and 2017 presidential elections. On 24 May 2021, Guillermo Lasso was sworn in as the new President of Ecuador, becoming the country's first right-wing leader in 14 years.

|President
|Guillermo Lasso
|Creating Opportunities
|24 May 2021
|-
|Vice President
|Alfredo Borrero
|Creating Opportunities
|24 May 2021
|}

Legislative branch

Ecuador has a unicameral National Assembly (Asamblea Nacional in Spanish), and it has 137 primary (seat-holding) members (all of whom are elected by popular vote to serve four-year terms). It is based on provincial constituencies, but it also has members coming from a national list and it has members representing the emigrant community.

History
On 29 November 2007, the Ecuadorian Constituent Assembly dismissed Congress on charges of corruption and then assumed legislative powers for itself. The Constituent Assembly then proposed a new National Assembly, which is the current institution.

Political parties and elections

Administrative divisions
Ecuador is divided into 24 provinces: Azuay, Bolívar, Cañar, Carchi, Chimborazo, Cotopaxi, El Oro, Esmeraldas, Galápagos Islands, Guayas, Imbabura, Loja, Los Ríos, Manabí, Morona-Santiago, Napo, Orellana, Pastaza, Pichincha, Santa Elena, Santo Domingo de los Tsáchilas, Sucumbíos, Tungurahua, Zamora-Chinchipe
Santa Elena Province.

Legal system
Ecuador's legal system is based on the civil law system. Ecuador recently accepted compulsory International Court of Justice jurisdiction.

Female representation in the Assembly
In 1979, there was no female representation. By 1984, there was only 4.2% of female representation with three deputies. In 1986, the number was reduced to one female parliamentarian.

Between 1988 and 1996, the average percentage of female representation was around of 5%. The following trends occurred:

 1998: 13%
 2003: 18%
 2006: 26%
 2007: 35%
 2009: 29%
 2013: 42%

In 2017, the leadership was led by three women: Gabriela Rivadeneira (President), Rosana Alvarado (First Vice-President) and Marcela Aguiñaga (Second Vice-President).

International organization participation
Ecuador or Ecuadorian organizations participate in the following international organizations:
 Bolivarian Alliance for the Americas (ALBA)
 Andean Community of Nations (CAN)
 Community of Latin American and Caribbean States (CELAC)
 Economic Commission for Latin America and the Caribbean (ECLAC)
 Food and Agriculture Organization (FAO)
 Group of Eleven (G-11), Group of 77 (G-77)
 Inter-American Development Bank (IADB)
 International Atomic Energy Agency (IAEA)
 International Bank for Reconstruction and Development (World Bank)
 International Civil Aviation Organization (ICAO)
 ICC
 ICC
 International Red Cross
 International Development Association (IDA)
 International Fund for Agricultural Development (IFAD)
 International Finance Corporation (IFC)
 International Hydrographic Organization (IHO)
 International Labour Organization (ILO)
 IMF
 International Maritime Organization (IMO)
 International Telecommunications Satellite Organization (Intelsat)
 Interpol
 IOC
 International Organization for Migration (IOM)
 International Organization for Standardization (ISO)
 International Telecommunication Union (ITU)
 International Trade Union Confederation (ITUC)
 Latin American Economic System (LAES)
 Latin American Integration Association (LAIA)
 Non-Aligned Movement (NAM)
 OAS
 Agency for the Prohibition of Nuclear Weapons in Latin America and the Caribbean (OPANAL)
 Organisation for the Prohibition of Chemical Weapons (OPCW)
 Permanent Court of Arbitration (PCA), RG
 UNASUR (headquarters)
 United Nations
 United Nations Conference on Trade and Development (UNCTAD)
 United Nations Educational, Scientific, and Cultural Organization (UNESCO)
 United Nations Industrial Development Organization (UNIDO)
 Universal Postal Union (UPU)
 World Federation of Trade Unions (WFTU)
 World Health Organization (WHO)
 World Intellectual Property Organization (WIPO)
 World Meteorological Organization (WMO)
 World Tourism Organization (WToO)
 World Trade Organization (WTO)

See also
 List of heads of state of Ecuador
 1830 Constitution of Ecuador
 2008 Constitution of Ecuador

References

External links
 National Assembly of Ecuador
 Presidency of Ecuador
 Supreme Court of Justice
 Global Integrity Report: Ecuador has analysis of corruption and anti-corruption in Ecuador